Princess Aurora Pavlovna Demidova di San Donato (2/3 November 1873 in Kiev – 28 June (OS: 16 June) 1904 in Turin) was a Russian noblewoman and by birth a member of the House of Demidov.

Early life

Aurora was born as the eldest daughter of Pavel Pavlovich Demidov, 2nd Prince of San Donato, and his second wife, Princess Elena Petrovna Trubetskoy (1853–1917). Her father was the son of the Finnish-Swede philanthropist Aurora Stjernvall von Waleen and her Russian husband, Pavel Nikolaievich Demidov. Her mother was a daughter of Prince Peter Nikitich Trubetskoy (1826–1880) and Princess Elizabeth Belosselsky-Belozersky.

First marriage

She married Prince Arsen of Serbia, youngest son of Alexander Karađorđević, Prince of Serbia and his wife Princess Persida, in Helsingfors (where her grandmother Aurora lived) at Uspenski Cathedral on 1 May 1892. They had a son, Prince Paul of Yugoslavia, who later became the Regent of Yugoslavia. She and Arsen divorced in 1896 because of an adventure of Aurora with a young Count Ernst Andreas von Manteuffel (1873–1953), elder son of Count Ernst Gotthard II von Manteuffel (1844-1922) and his wife, Marie Dorothea von Weiss (1847-1938). The fruit of this "adventure" was the birth of twins, Nikolai (1895–1933) and Sergei (1895–1912). Nikolai is also buried next to his mother in the Russian cemetery (Caucade) of Nice.

Second marriage

She remarried an Italian Count Palatine Nicola Giovanni Maria di Noghera (Eboli, 15 June 1875 – Genoa, 1 April 1944) on 4 November 1897, with whom she had four children: Helena Aurora, Alberto, Giovanni, and Amedeo di Noghera.

Death

She died on 16 June 1904 in Turin and was buried in the Russian Orthodox Cemetery, Nice, (France).

References

External links
 http://awt.ancestry.com/cgi-bin/igm.cgi?op=GET&db=samspage&id=I38537&ti=5538
 https://web.archive.org/web/20100620054813/http://jssgallery.org/Essay/Italy/Demidoff/Princess_Aurore_Pavlona_Demidoff.htm

1873 births
1904 deaths
Aurora
People from Kyiv
Expatriates from the Russian Empire in Italy
Philanthropists from the Russian Empire
People from the Russian Empire of Swedish descent
Princesses from the Russian Empire
19th-century philanthropists